Imperata brevifolia is a species of grass known by the common name California satintail.

Distribution
It is native to the Southwestern United States from California to Texas. It is also native to northern Mexico, where it grows in arid regions where water is available.

Description
Imperata brevifolia is a perennial grass growing from a hard rhizome to heights near 1.5 meters. The flat leaves are up to 50 centimeters long and 1.5 wide. The inflorescence is a narrow, cylindrical white plume up 10 to 30 centimeters long. It is filled thickly with silky white hairs and dotted with dark speckles which are the orange-brown anthers and purplish-brown stigmas of the spikelets.

External links
Jepson Manual Treatment - Imperata brevifolia
Imperata brevifolia - Photo gallery

Andropogoneae
Grasses of the United States
Native grasses of California
Grasses of Mexico
Flora of the Southwestern United States
Flora of the California desert regions
Natural history of the California chaparral and woodlands
Natural history of the Mojave Desert
Natural history of the Transverse Ranges
Flora without expected TNC conservation status